Divine Liturgy of Saint John Chrysostom or Liturgy of Saint John Chrysostom may refer to:
 Liturgy of Saint John Chrysostom, the primary worship service in the Byzantine Rite.

It may refer also to choral compositions that set the liturgical text:
 Liturgy of St. John Chrysostom (Tchaikovsky), op. 41, composed by Pyotr Tchaikovsky in 1880.
 Divine Liturgy of St. John Chrysostom (Mokranjac), composed by Stevan Mokranjac in 1895.
 Liturgy of St. John Chrysostom (Rachmaninoff), op. 31, composed by Sergei Rachmaninoff in 1910.
 Liturgy of St. John Chrysostom (Leontovych) musical setting composed by Mykola Leontovych in 1919.